Philosophy is an album by the British dance music duo Coldcut released in 1993. Vocals on this album are by Janis Alexander.

Track listing

 "Philosophy"
 "Chocolate Box"
 "Pearls Before Swine"
 "What We're Living For"
 "Leaving Home"
 "Dreamer" (Crazy Swing Mix)
 "Peace & Love"
 "Kinda Natural"
 "Autumn Leaves" (Irresistible Force Full Chill)
 "Autumn Leaves" (Acapella)
 "Eine Kleine Hed Musik"
 "Sign"
 "Angel Heart"

References

External links
 Philosophy (album) at Discogs

Coldcut albums
1993 albums
Soul albums by English artists